A corps is a large military unit usually composed of two or more divisions.

Corps may also refer to:

Places 
 Corps, Isère, a commune in the department of Isère in France
 Corps de Garde, a mountain in the Moka Range in Mauritius
 Corps de Garde, a MONKE

Military 
 Air Training Corps, UK or New Zealand Air Cadets
 Corps des Sapeurs-Pompiers, a military force in Monaco composed mainly of officers from French military or fire services
 United States Marine Corps, a branch of the United States Armed Forces responsible for providing power projection from the sea

Civic organizations 
 AmeriCorps, a program of the U.S. federal government engaging adults in intensive community service
 Civilian Conservation Corps (CCC), a public work relief program that operated from 1933 to 1942 in the United States
 Diplomatic corps, the collective body of foreign diplomats accredited to a particular country or body
 Job Corps, a program of the United States Department of Labor that offers education and vocational training
 Mercy Corps, a global aid agency engaged in transitional environments that have experienced some sort of shock
 National Association of Service and Conservation Corps (NASCC), an association of Service and Conservation Corps in the United States
 Peace Corps, a volunteer program run by the United States government
 Senior Corps, a United States government agency to provide aid to senior citizens
 Youth Conservation Corps, a summer work youth program in U.S. federally managed lands

Other uses 
 Corps (church), a place of worship in The Salvation Army
 CORPS (Complete Omniversal Role Playing System), a generic role-playing game system
 Ambulance corps, an emergency service dedicated to providing out-of-hospital acute medical care
 Corps de ballet, the group of dancers who are not soloists
 German Student Corps, Germany's traditional university corporations or fraternities
 Corps Altsachsen Dresden, a German Student Corps in the Weinheimer SC-Verband
 Corps Hubertia Freiburg, one of the oldest German Student Corps in the Kösener SC-Verband with strong Hunting tradition
 Corps Vandalia-Teutonia, a German Student Corps in the Kösener SC-Verband
 Green Lantern Corps, a fictional intergalactic military/police force appearing in comics published by DC Comics
 Press corps, a group of reporters covering a specific entity or event
 An abbreviation of Corporation

See also
 Corpse, a dead human body
 The Corps (disambiguation)
 Core (disambiguation)

ja:コープス